The Arnold Springs Farmstead is a historic farmstead on Jennings Lane on the northwest edge of Melbourne, Arkansas.  The farmhouse on the  property is a log structure clad in weatherboard whose construction has been dated to the mid-1850s.  It was originally built as a dogtrot, which was enclosed in the late 19th century.  The exterior of the house has vernacular Greek Revival styling, also applied in the late 19th century.  The property also includes a collection of 19th- and early 20th-century agricultural outbuildings, as well as an early stone wall and bridge.  Sited near a locally significant fresh-water spring, the site served as a tavern and traveler's rest stop for many years.

The property was listed on the National Register of Historic Places in 2010.

See also
National Register of Historic Places listings in Izard County, Arkansas

References

Houses on the National Register of Historic Places in Arkansas
Georgian architecture in Arkansas
Greek Revival houses in Arkansas
Houses completed in 1857
Houses in Izard County, Arkansas
National Register of Historic Places in Izard County, Arkansas
1857 establishments in Arkansas